Cathal Crowe (born 1 October 1982) is an Irish Fianna Fáil politician who has been a Teachta Dála (TD) for the Clare constituency since the 2020 general election.

Political career
Crowe was first elected to Clare County Council in 2004 at 21 years of age, making him the youngest councillor in Ireland. Reflecting on this in a 2019 interview, Crowe said "I was very green when first elected. I didn’t own a suit at the time, I was finishing exams at UL and drove around on a scooter. With my first pay cheque from the Council I bought a PlayStation 2. For all the experience I lacked, I had huge hunger and desire to make things better for my community and the Council".

In 2019, as the Mayor of County Clare, he gained attention as the first politician to decide to boycott the government's commemoration of the Royal Irish Constabulary. He was a member of Clare County Council for the Shannon local electoral area from 2004 to 2020.

Crowe went on to successfully contest three more elections to Clare County Council in 2009, 2014 and 2019, twice topping the poll by receiving the most first preference votes.

Personal life
Crowe is the son of Michael, a retired fire fighter and Irene, a retired nurse. In 2013, he married Maeve Fehilly from Charleville, County Cork. The couple have three children together.

Prior to being elected as a TD, Crowe was a primary school teacher in Parteen National School.

References

External links
Cathal Crowe's page on the Fianna Fáil website

Living people
1982 births
Members of the 33rd Dáil
Fianna Fáil TDs
Local councillors in County Clare
Mayors of places in the Republic of Ireland